"I Don't Wanna Fight" is a song by American singer and actress Tina Turner. The track was written by British singer Lulu, her brother Billy Lawrie, and Steve DuBerry. The song was first offered to singer Sade, who sent it on to Turner. Turner recorded it in 1993 as part of the soundtrack for her autobiographical film, What's Love Got to Do with It. Lulu's version appears as a B-side to her 1993 single "How 'Bout Us" as well as on the 2003 album The Greatest Hits.

Featuring a wistful but resolute vocal set against a synthesizer line, the track was a substantial hit on both sides of the Atlantic, reaching No. 9 on the US Billboard Hot 100, becoming her seventh and last top ten hit. In United Kingdom it peaked No. 7, in Canada it peaked at No. 1 for three weeks, and in Iceland it reached No. 3. The song was nominated at the 36th Grammy Awards for Best Female Pop Vocal Performance and The Grammy Award for Best Song Written Specifically for a Motion Picture or for Television. It was also awarded one of BMI's Pop Songs Awards in 1994, honoring the songwriters, composers and music publishers of the song. To date, it remains Turner's last single to chart in the top ten of the Billboard Hot 100. Its accompanying music video received heavy rotation on MTV Europe.

Critical reception
The song received positive reviews from music critics. Larry Flick from Billboard complimented Turner's "distinctive and worldly vocal delivery". He also noted that she makes her Virgin debut "with a shuffling pop/dance ditty" that stylistically lands somewhere between her comeback hit, "Let's Stay Together", and Amy Grant's "Baby Baby". The Daily Vault called it "cinematic epic", stating that it "shows Turner capable of riding today's wave effortlessly without losing herself in it". Alan Jones from Music Week viewed it as "a soulful shuffle", that "benefits from rich arrangements and one of Turner's more restrained, though distinctive, vocals." A reviewer from People Magazine described it as an "ardent ballad", that prove that the singer "has mellowed". Sam Wood from Philadelphia Inquirer opined that it's a "overproduced ballad". James Hunter from Vibe felt that "when Turner tears up her voice at the top of the bridge, it's as involving as soulful pop music gets." He concluded, "This is one of the best records of her career."

Track listing and formats

European CD, cassette and 7" / UK cassette and 7" / Australian cassette single
"I Don't Wanna Fight" (Single Edit) – 4:25
"The Best" (Single Edit) – 4:08

European CD and 12" / Australian CD single
"I Don't Wanna Fight" (Single Edit) – 4:25
"Tina's Wish" – 3:08
"I Don't Wanna Fight" (Urban Mix) – 5:17
"I Don't Wanna Fight" (Holiday Inn Lounge Mix) – 5:43

UK CD single #1"
"I Don't Wanna Fight" (Single Edit) – 4:25
"Tina's Wish" (Single Edit) – 3:08
"I Don't Wanna Fight" (Urban Mix) – 5:17

UK CD single #2"
"I Don't Wanna Fight" (Single Edit) – 4:25
"The Best" (Single Edit) – 4:08
"I Don't Wanna Lose You" – 4:20
"What's Love Got to Do with It" – 3:48

US 7" and cassette / Japanese CD single
"I Don't Wanna Fight" (Single Edit) – 4:25
"Tina's Wish" – 3:08

US 7" promotional CD single
"I Don't Wanna Fight" (Chris Lord-Alge Urban Overnight Mix) – 4:19
"I Don't Wanna Fight" (Jerry Moran Dance Mix) – 4:39

US 7" promotional CD single
"I Don't Wanna Fight" (Single Edit) – 4:06
"I Don't Wanna Fight" (Urban Radio) – 4:03
"I Don't Wanna Fight" (Urban Mix) – 5:15
"I Don't Wanna Fight" (Holiday Inn Lounge Mix) – 5:43
"I Don't Wanna Fight" (Club House Mix) – 5:26
"I Don't Wanna Fight" (Urban Radio Instrumental) – 4:02
"I Don't Wanna Fight" (LP Version) – 6:05

Charts

Weekly charts

Year-end charts

References

1990s ballads
1993 singles
1993 songs
Lulu (singer) songs
Pop ballads
RPM Top Singles number-one singles
Songs written for films
Songs written by Billy Lawrie
Songs written by Lulu (singer)
Songs written by Steve DuBerry
Tina Turner songs